Romans 13 is the thirteenth chapter of the Epistle to the Romans in the New Testament of the Christian Bible. It is authored by Paul the Apostle, while he was in Corinth in the mid-50s AD, with the help of an amanuensis (secretary), Tertius, who adds his own greeting in Romans 16:22. Paul wrote to the Roman Christians because he was "eager to preach the gospel" to them, so as to remind them on "certain subjects". Although he had been hindered from coming to them many times, he longed to encourage the Roman church by reminding them of the gospel, because of his calling to the Gentiles as well as to the Jews.

In this chapter, Paul reminds his readers that they should honour and obey the secular authorities. Reformer Martin Luther suggested that "he includes this, not because it makes people virtuous in the sight of God, but because it does insure that the virtuous have outward peace and protection and that the wicked cannot do evil without fear and in undisturbed peace".

Text
The original text was written in Koine Greek. This chapter is divided into 14 verses.

Textual witnesses
Some early manuscripts containing the text of this chapter are:
 In Greek:
 Codex Vaticanus (AD 325–350)
 Codex Sinaiticus (330–360)
 Codex Alexandrinus (400–440)
 Codex Ephraemi Rescriptus (~450; extant verses 11–14)
 in Gothic language
 Codex Carolinus (6th/7th century; extant: verses 1–5)
 in Latin
 Codex Carolinus (6th/7th century; extant: verses 1–5)

Context

Love your neighbour (verse 9)

Verse 9 alludes to Exodus 20:13–15, Deuteronomy 5:17–19, 21, and Leviticus 19:18. The King James Bible includes "You shall not bear false witness" in the verse because of its presence in the Textus Receptus. The Cambridge Bible for Schools and Colleges suggests that it is "perhaps to be omitted, on documentary evidence".

The day is at hand (verses 11–14)

Non-conformist theologian Matthew Henry calls verses 11–14 "a Christian's directory for his day's work". According to the Cambridge Bible for Schools and Colleges, "Paul enforces all the preceding precepts (of chapters 12 and 13) by the solemn assertion of the approach of the eternal Day of Resurrection and Glory", "for now is our salvation nearer than when we believed" (King James Version). Many translations, such as the New King James Version and Revised Standard Version, refer to "when we  believed".

Political meaning and use
Some interpreters have claimed that Romans 13 implies that Christians are to obey all public officials under all circumstances. Many interpreters and biblical scholars dispute this view, however. Thomas Aquinas interprets Paul's derivation of authority from God as conditional on the circumstances in which authority is obtained and the manner in which it is used:

Petr Chelčický interpreted the verse in the sense that it was addressed in a pagan age with a pagan society telling Christians that a Christian out of humility should submit to such pagan practices, but that in a Christian society such pagan practices should not be imposed in any way.

According to biblical scholars John Barton and John Muddiman:

On occasion, Romans 13 is employed in civil discourse and by politicians and philosophers in support of or against political issues. Two conflicting arguments are made: that the passage mandates obedience to civil law; and that there are limits to authority beyond which obedience is not required. John Calvin, in Institutes of the Christian Religion took the latter position: "that we might not yield a slavish obedience to the depraved wishes of men". Martin Luther employed Romans 13 in Against the Robbing and Murdering Hordes of Peasants to advocate that it would be sinful for a prince or lord not to use force, including violent force, to fulfil the duties of their office.

Theologian Paul Tillich is critical of an interpretation that would cast Romans 13:1–7 in opposition to revolutionary movements:

Daniel J. Harrington suggests that Romans 13:1–7 is not about the doctrine of church and state. Under the emperor Claudius (AD 41–54), the Jews in Rome (including Jewish Christians) were expelled from the city. In AD 56–57 when Paul wrote to the Roman Christians, they had only recently been allowed to return. It is possible that the passage was intended as a piece of pragmatic advice addressed to a specific crisis, calling for patient cooperation with the Roman officials for the time being while waiting for the imminent manifestation of God's kingdom.
 
Romans 13 was used during the period of the American Revolution both by loyalists who preached obedience to the Crown and by revolutionaries who argued for freedom from the unjust authority of the King. Later in US history, Romans 13 was employed by anti-abolitionists to justify and legitimize the keeping of slaves; notably around the time of the Fugitive Slave Act of 1850 which precipitated debate as to whether the law should be obeyed or resisted. It was also used by the Dutch Reformed Church to justify apartheid rule in South Africa.

In June 2018, Romans 13 was used by Jeff Sessions to justify the Trump administration family separation policy, saying:

Commenting on the fight to define Romans 13, historian Lincoln Mullen argues that "what the attorney general actually has on his side is the thread of American history that justifies oppression and domination in the name of law and order."

See also
 Ten Commandments
 Greatest commandment
 The powers that be
 Render unto Caesar, another Biblical discussion of how Christians should interact with secular authorities
 Related Bible parts: Exodus 20, Leviticus 19, Deuteronomy 5

References

Bibliography

External links
 King James Bible - Wikisource
English Translation with Parallel Latin Vulgate
Online Bible at GospelHall.org (ESV, KJV, Darby, American Standard Version, Bible in Basic English)
Multiple bible versions at Bible Gateway (NKJV, NIV, NRSV etc.)

13
Christianity and government